Rene Enriquez may refer to:
Rene Enriquez (mobster), American Mexican Mafia member
René Enríquez, Nicaraguan-born American television actor of the 1970s and 1980s